Carabus truncaticollis is a species of beetle from the family Carabidae found in Russia and the eastern Palearctic realm. In eastern Asia, the species ranges from Siberia south to Mongolia; it is also found in North America in NW Canada, and Alaska.  The species is found in mesic tundra environments, such as moist meadows.

References

truncaticollis
Beetles described in 1833
Beetles of Asia
Beetles of North America